Evergreen is an unincorporated community in Upshur County, West Virginia.

References 

Unincorporated communities in West Virginia
Unincorporated communities in Upshur County, West Virginia